
Year 1556 (MDLVI) was a leap year starting on Wednesday (link will display the full calendar) of the Julian calendar.

Events 
 January–June 
 January 16 – Charles V, having already abdicated as Holy Roman Emperor, resigns the Kingdom of Spain in favour of his son, Philip II, and retires to a monastery.
 January 23 –  The Shaanxi earthquake, the deadliest earthquake in history, occurs with its epicenter in Shaanxi province, China; 830,000 people may have been killed.
 February 5 – Truce of Vaucelles: Fighting temporarily ends between France and Spain.
 February 14
 Akbar the Great ascends the throne of the Mughal Empire at age 13; he will rule until his death in 1605, by which time most of the north and centre of the Indian subcontinent will be under his control.
 Archbishop of Canterbury Thomas Cranmer is declared a heretic.
 February 22 (approx.) – Sophia Jagiellon marries Henry V, Duke of Brunswick-Lüneburg.
 March 21 – In Oxford, Thomas Cranmer is burned at the stake for treason.

 July–December 
 November – The Truce of Vaucelles collapses, and war resumes between Henry II of France and Philip II of Spain.
 November 5 – Second Battle of Panipat: Fifty miles north of Delhi, a Mughal army defeats the forces of Hemu, to ensure Akbar the throne of India.

Date unknown 
 The kings of Spain take control of the Flanders region, including what is now the French département of Nord.
 The Plantations of Ireland are started in King's County (now County Offaly) and Queen's County (now County Laois), the earliest attempt at systematic ethnic cleansing in Ireland, by the Roman Catholic ruler Queen Mary I of England.
 Future King Prince John, younger son of King Gustav I of Sweden becomes Duke of Finland.
 Ivan the Terrible conquers Astrakhan, opening the Volga River to Russian traffic and trade.
 The Welser banking families of Augsburg lose colonial control of Venezuela.
 Lorenzo Priuli becomes Doge of Venice.
 The false Martin Guerre appears in the French village of Artigat.
 The first printing press in India is introduced by Jesuits, at Saint Paul's College, Goa.

Births 

 January 8 – Uesugi Kagekatsu, Japanese samurai and warlord (d. 1623)
 January 24 – Christian Barnekow, Danish noble, explorer and diplomat (d. 1612)
 February 4 – Dorothea of Hanau-Münzenberg, German noblewoman (d. 1638)
 February 7 – Countess Maria of Nassau (d. 1616)
 February 16 – Tōdō Takatora, Japanese daimyō (d. 1630)
 February 21 – Sethus Calvisius, German calendar reformer (d. 1615)
 March 7 – Guillaume du Vair, French statesman and philosopher (d. 1621)
 March 13 – Dirck van Os, Dutch merchant (d. 1615)
 April 8 – David Hoeschel, German librarian (d. 1617)
 April 9 – Andreas von Auersperg, Carniolan noble and military commander in the battle of Sisak (d. 1593)
 April 27 – François Béroalde de Verville, French writer (d. 1626)
 May 31 – Jerzy Radziwiłł, Polish Catholic cardinal (d. 1600)
 June 6 – Edward la Zouche, 11th Baron Zouche, English politician and diplomat (d. 1625)
 June 13 – Pomponio Nenna, Italian composer (d. 1608)
 June 24
 Victoria of Valois, French princess (d. 1556)
 Joan of Valois, French princess (d. 1556)
 July 9 – Elizabeth Finch, 1st Countess of Winchilsea, English countess (d. 1634)
 July 22 – Otto Henry, Count Palatine of Sulzbach (d. 1604)
 July 26 – James Melville, Scottish divine and reformer (d. 1614)
 August 10 – Philipp Nicolai, German Lutheran pastor (d. 1608)
 August 16 – Bartolomeo Cesi, Italian painter (d. 1629)
 August 17 – Alexander Briant, English Jesuit martyr (d. 1581)
 September 21 – William Harris, English knight (d. 1616)
 October 18
Charles I, Duke of Elbeuf, French duke and nobleman (d. 1605)
John Dormer, English Member of Parliament (d. 1626)
 October 24 – Giovanni Battista Caccini, Italian artist (d. 1613)
 October 26 – Ahmad Baba al Massufi, Malian academic (d. 1627)
 November 15 – Jacques Davy Duperron, French cardinal (d. 1618)
 November 28 – Francesco Contarini, Doge of Venice (d. 1624)
 December 5 – Anne Cecil, Countess of Oxford, English countess (d. 1588)
 December 17 – Abdul Rahim Khan-I-Khana, Indian composer (d. 1627)
 December 27 – Jeanne de Lestonnac, French saint (d. 1640)
 date unknown
 Margaret Clitherow, English Catholic martyr (d. 1586)
 Ahmad Baba al Massufi, Sudanese writer and political leader (d. 1627)

Deaths 

 January 8 – Anne Shelton, English courtier, elder sister of Thomas Boleyn (b. 1475)
 January 27 – Humayun, 2nd Mughal Emperor (b. 1508)
 February 12 – Giovanni Poggio, Italian cardinal and diplomat (b. 1493)
 February 26 – Frederick II, Elector Palatine (1544–1556) (b. 1482)
 March 21 – Thomas Cranmer, Archbishop of Canterbury (burned at the stake) (b. 1489)
 April 18 
 Luigi Alamanni, Italian poet and statesman (b. 1495)
 John Gage, English courtier of the Tudor period (b. 1479)
 April 26 – Valentin Friedland, German scholar and educationist of the Reformation (b. 1490)
 May 4 – Luca Ghini, Italian physician and botanist (b. 1490)
 May 28 – Saitō Dōsan, Japanese warlord (b. 1494)
 June 10 – Martin Agricola, German composer (b. 1486)
 June 24 – Joan of Valois, French princess (b. 1556)
 July 31 – Ignatius of Loyola, Spanish founder of the Jesuit order and saint (b. 1491)
 August 1 – Girolamo da Carpi, Italian painter (b. 1501)
 August 11 – John Bell, Bishop of Worcester
 August 17 –  Victoria of Valois, French princess (b. 1556)
 September – Patrick Hepburn, 3rd Earl of Bothwell, Scottish traitor (b. 1512)
 October 7 – Frederick of Denmark, Prince-bishop (b. 1532)
 October 21 – Pietro Aretino, Italian author (b. 1492)
 November 10 – Richard Chancellor, English Arctic explorer (drowned at sea) (b. c. 1521)
 November 14 – Giovanni della Casa, Italian poet (b. 1503)
 date unknown
 Tullia d'Aragona, Italian poet, author and philosopher (b. 1510)
 Fuzûlî, Turkish poet (b. 1494)
probable 
 Brian mac Cathaoir O Conchobhair Failghe, last of the Kings of Ui Failghe
 Jacob Clemens non Papa, Flemish composer (b. 1510)

References